Koper railway station is a railway station in Koper, Slovenia.

External links 
Official site of the Slovenian railways (in English)

Buildings and structures in Koper
Railway stations in Slovenia